Neolepton is a genus of marine bivalve molluscs of the family Neoleptonidae.

Species in the genus Neolepton
 Neolepton amatoi Zelaya & Ituarte, 2004
 Neolepton antipodum (Filhol, 1880)
 Neolepton arjanbosi 2003
 Neolepton atlanticum 1890
 Neolepton benguelensis 1998
 Neolepton bonaerense 2004
 Neolepton caledonicum 1998
 Neolepton cancellatum 1998
 Neolepton cobbi 1910
 Neolepton concentricum 1912
 Neolepton discriminatum 2001
 Neolepton faberi 2003
 Neolepton falklandicum 1964
 Neolepton georgianum 2003
 Neolepton guanche 1998
 Neolepton holmbergi 2003
 Neolepton hupei 1957
 Neolepton moolenbeeki 2003
 Neolepton novacambricum 1915
 Neolepton peetersae 2003
 Neolepton planiliratum 1911
 Neolepton powelli Dell, 1964
 Neolepton profundorum 2000
 Neolepton sootryeni 1998
 Neolepton sublaevigatum Powell, 1937
 Neolepton subobliquum Powell, 1937
 Neolepton subtrigonum 1857
 Neolepton sulcatulum 1859
 Neolepton triangulare Dell, 1956
 Neolepton umbonatum 1885
 Neolepton veneris 1877
 Neolepton victor 2003
 Neolepton yagan 2004

Species Neolepton obliquatum Chaster, 1897 was accepted as Coracuta obliquata (Chaster, 1897).

Species Neolepton sykesi (Chaster, 1895) accepted as Arculus sykesii (Chaster, 1895).

References
 Powell A. W. B., New Zealand Mollusca, William Collins Publishers Ltd, Auckland, New Zealand 1979 

Neoleptonidae
Bivalve genera